Conrad (or Coenraad) Schetz de Grobbendonck, later Conrad d'Ursel (1553–1632) was a nobleman in the Habsburg Netherlands and in 1604–1609 the first ordinary ambassador to England for the Archdukes Albert and Isabella.

Ursel family

The 5th son of Gaspard II Schetz and Catharina d'Ursel, daughter of Lancelot II of Ursel, he was baptised in Antwerp on 19 March 1553. His parents had 21 children in total, eight of whom survived to adulthood. He was the fifth son. His father was the chief banker in Antwerp, financing several merchants who traded to Russia and Brazil, as well as being banker to Philip II of Spain, which gave him a political role and made him a leading figure in the Antwerp of the second half of the 16th century.

In 1617 he inherited the estates of his aunt, Barbara of Ursel, last heir of Lancelot II of Ursel, on the condition that he and his heirs in perpetuity change their name and coat of arms to d'Ursel.

Descendants 
Conrad, 1st Count of Ursel, 2nd Baron of Hoboken, Vicomte of Vives-St-Eloy, Zennegem, Oostkamp , Lord of Highene, Lord of Rumst, Lord of Opdorp, Lord of Beernem, Grand Forrestier of Flanders and became a Count of the Holy Roman Empire in 1638. Married to Anne Maria de Robles. Died 1659.
Francois, 2nd Count of Ursel, 3rd Baron of Hoboken and Grand Forrestier of Flanders, married to Honorine Maria Dorothea, Princess of Horne.
Conrad-Albert, 1st Duke d'Ursel, 1st Duke of Hoboken, married to Eleonora von Salm

Career 
In his youth Conrad was engaged in mercantile affairs, but in 1582 he obtained a government position as councillor and commissioner extraordinary for Domains and Finances. In 1584 he was appointed comptroller of artillery, and in 1587 superintendent of munitions in fortified places. 1587 was also the year that Conrad married Françoise, the daughter of Jean Richardot, president of the Brussels Privy Council. In 1588 he was knighted and became an ordinary councillor of the Council of Finance in Brussels.

In 1600 he was created Baron Hoboken, and in 1604 appointed archducal ambassador to England. He remained in this post until 1609.

In 1632 he, alongside the Duke of Aarschot, represented the nobility of Brabant in the Estates General.

Ancestors

References

1553 births
1632 deaths
Ursel
People from Antwerp
Ambassadors of the Habsburg Netherlands
People of the Eighty Years' War
Nobility of the Spanish Netherlands